2-Methoxybenzaldehyde is an organic compound with the formula CH3OC6H4CHO.  It is also commonly referred to as o-anisaldehyde, and is the methylated version of salicylaldehyde.  The molecule consists of a benzene ring with formyl and a methoxy groups on adjacent positions.  It is a colorless solid with a pleasant aroma.  The related isomer 4-anisaldehyde is better known, being a commercial flavorant. 2-Anisaldehyde is prepared commercially by formylation of anisole.

References 

Flavors
Benzaldehydes